Alexandra Coletti (born 8 August 1983 in La Colle, Monaco) is a Monégasque alpine skier who competed for Monaco in the 2006 Winter Olympics. She also received the silver medal in downhill skiing at the 2005 European Cup. She later competed for Monaco at the 2010 Winter Olympics, and was Monaco's flag bearer during the Opening Ceremony. Her brother Stefano Coletti is a racing driver currently racing in the IndyCar Series.

References

External links

1983 births
Living people
Monegasque female alpine skiers
People from Monte Carlo
Monegasque people of Italian descent
Olympic alpine skiers of Monaco
Alpine skiers at the 2006 Winter Olympics
Alpine skiers at the 2010 Winter Olympics
Alpine skiers at the 2014 Winter Olympics
Alpine skiers at the 2018 Winter Olympics